Saboti Constituency is an electoral constituency in Kenya. It is one of five constituencies in Trans-Nzoia County. The constituency was established for the 1988 election.

Members of Parliament

Wards

References 

Constituencies in Trans-Nzoia County
Constituencies in Rift Valley Province
1988 establishments in Kenya
Constituencies established in 1988